National Institute of Statistics may refer to:
National Institute of Statistics of Bolivia
National Institute of Statistics of Cambodia
National Institute of Statistics and Census of Costa Rica
National Institute of Statistics and Census of Nicaragua
National Institute of Statistics (Guatemala)
National Institute of Statistics (Italy)
National Institute of Statistics (Portugal) 
National Institute of Statistics (Romania)
National Institute of Statistics (Spain)
National Institute of Statistics (Tunisia)

See also
List of national and international statistical services
National Statistics Institute (Chile)
National Institute of Statistics and Census (disambiguation)
Instituto Nacional de Estadística (disambiguation)
Instituto Nacional de Estadística e Informática, a Peruvian government agency
Instituto Nacional de Estadística y Geografía, a Mexican government agency